Tord Erik Stefan Henriksson (born 13 April 1965) is a retired Swedish triple jumper, best known for his bronze medal at the 1991 World Indoor Championships. His personal best was 17.21 metres, achieved in July 1993 in Bad Cannstatt. He is married to middle-distance runner Maria Akraka.

International competitions

External links

Profile

1965 births
Living people
Sportspeople from Karlstad
Swedish male triple jumpers
Olympic male triple jumpers
Olympic athletes of Sweden
Athletes (track and field) at the 1992 Summer Olympics
Universiade medalists in athletics (track and field)
Universiade silver medalists for Sweden
Medalists at the 1989 Summer Universiade
World Athletics Championships athletes for Sweden
Japan Championships in Athletics winners
20th-century Swedish people